Zurdo, is a 2003 Mexican fantasy adventure film, directed by Carlos Salces from the same company that produced Amores Perros.

Translated from Spanish, the title means "Lefty."

Storyline 

The story is of a young boy called Lefty, a gifted marble player who lives in an urban housing complex. One day a stranger arrives claiming to know the best marble player in the world and challenges Lefty to a contest. The news sends the townspeople into a frenzy and they put all their hopes and dreams into their little hero winning much more than a simple game of marbles. With success well within his grasp, Lefty is faced with a dilemma when a corrupt local official comes along to sabotage his chances.

Contributing artists 

The music is by Paul van Dyk who won an Ariel (Mexican Oscar) for his work, he also has released the soundtrack to the film in the form of an album.

External links

2000s fantasy adventure films
2000s Spanish-language films
2003 films
Films about gambling
Mexican fantasy adventure films
2000s Mexican films